The Legeriomycetaceae are a family of fungi in the Harpellales order. The family contains 31 genera and 158 species.

Genera
Allantomyces
Austrosmittium
Baetimyces
Barbatospora
Bojamyces
Capniomyces
Caudomyces
Coleopteromyces
Ejectosporus
Furculomyces
Gauthieromyces
Genistelloides
Genistellospora
Glotzia
Graminella
Graminelloides
Lancisporomyces
Legerioides
Legeriomyces
Legeriosimilis
Orphella
Pennella
Plecopteromyces
Pteromaktron
Simuliomyces
Smittium
Spartiella
Stipella
Tectimyces
Trichozygospora
Zygopolaris

References

External links

Zygomycota